Santa Cruz is a small village on the island of Ometepe in Lake Nicaragua,  Rivas, Nicaragua.
There's also a  Playa Santa Cruz; the beach of Santa Cruz. Santa Cruz is famous for its hostel

Populated places in Nicaragua